Balance or balancedness  is a property of apportionment methods, which are methods of allocating identical items between among agens, such as dividing seats in a parliament among political parties or federal states. The property says that, if two agents have exactly the same entitlements, then the number of items they receive should differ by at most one. So if two parties win the same number of votes, or two states have the same populations, then the number of seats they receive should differ by at most one.

Ideally, agents with identical entitlements should receive an identical number of items, but this may be impossible due to the indivisibility of the items. Balancedness requires that the difference between identical-entitlement agents should be the smallest difference allowed by the indivisibility, which is 1.

Definitions 
For example, it can be an integer representing the number of seats in a house of representatives. The resource should be allocated between some  agents, such as states or parties. The agents have different entitlements, denoted by a vector . For example, ti can be the fraction of votes won by party i. An allocation rule is a rule that, for any  and entitlement vector , returns an allocation vector .

An allocation rule is called balanced if  implies  for all i,j. Equivalently,   implies  for all i,j.

Properties 
All known apportionment methods are balanced. In particular, both Highest averages methods and Largest remainder methods are balanced.

Every apportionment method that is anonymous, exact and coherent, is also balanced.

References 

Apportionment method criteria